Halgerda tessellata is a species of sea slug, a dorid nudibranch, shell-less marine gastropod mollusks in the family Discodorididae.

Distribution
This species was described from Palau. It occurs from the western shores of the Indian Ocean in Kenya, Tanzania and Madagascar to SE Australia and the Mariana Islands, Pacific Ocean.

References

Discodorididae
Gastropods described in 1880